Edward Lone Fight (born May 28, 1939) served as Chairman of the Mandan, Hidatsa and Arikara Nation (Three Affiliated Tribes) from 1986 to 1990. In 1988 Lone Fight met with President Ronald Reagan, a meeting which was the catalyst for the Just Compensation Bill, introduced based on the findings of the Joint Tribal Advisory Committee, which provided the tribes partial compensation for the flooding of reservation due to the construction of the Garrison Dam under the Pick-Sloan Legislation.

From 1994-1998 he served as the tribal program's manager for the Three Affiliated Tribes.  He retired as Superintendent of Mandaree School, Mandaree, North Dakota, in 2000.

Lone Fight is a fluent speaker of the Hidatsa language and a traditionalist. He graduated from Dickinson State University with a major in Biology; one of the earliest Native Americans to do so. He also holds a master's degree in Education and a master's degree in Public Administration.

The son of Mabel Good Bird and Theodore Lone Fight, Edward is also a direct descendant of Waheenie Wea (Buffalo Bird Woman), Sheheke, and Chief Four Bears. "Lone Fight" is a broad family name related exclusively to the Mandan, Hidatsa and Arikara Nation of the Fort Berthold Reservation in North Dakota.

Notes

External links
Three Affiliated Tribes Homepage
North Dakota Tribal Leaders
Contemporary Tribal Leaders NDSU

1939 births
Living people
Native American leaders
People from McLean County, North Dakota
Dickinson State University alumni
People from McKenzie County, North Dakota
20th-century Native Americans
21st-century Native Americans